White Shit is an American punk rock band, most significant for their 2009 song "Jim Morrison". They released their debut album, Sculpted Beef, in 2009.

Discography
Sculpted Beef (2009)
Carry Me (2010)
White Shi'ite (2010)

References

American punk rock groups